Hugo Javier Martínez Cantero, known as Hugo Martínez (born 27 April 2000) is a Paraguayan professional footballer who plays as a midfielder for Libertad and the Paraguay national team.

International career
He made his debut for the Paraguay national football team on 2 September 2021 in a World Cup qualifier against Ecuador, a 0–2 away loss. He started the game and was substituted after 65 minutes of play.

References

External links
 

2000 births
People from Cordillera Department
Living people
Paraguayan footballers
Paraguay international footballers
Association football midfielders
Club Libertad footballers
Paraguayan Primera División players